Milan Šperl (born 26 February 1980 in Karlovy Vary) is a Czech cross-country skier who has been competing since 2000.

Professional career 
He won a bronze medal in the team sprint (with Dušan Kožíšek) at the 2007 FIS Nordic World Ski Championships in Sapporo. Šperl's best individual finish at the FIS Nordic World Ski Championships was a sixth in the 50 km event at Oberstdorf in 2005.

He is also a six times champion of the Czech Republic in individual races (2002 1.8 km sprint, 2003 50 km classical  2004 1.2 km sprint  and 50 km freestyle, 2005 2 × 10 km double pursuit, and 2006 10 km freestyle.)

Olympic career 
His best finish at the Winter Olympics was 27th in the 50 km event at Turin in 2006. Šperl has a total of eight individual victories at distances up to 15 km since 2002 in FIS races.

Cross-country skiing results
All results are sourced from the International Ski Federation (FIS).

Olympic Games

World Championships
 1 medal – (1 bronze)

World Cup

Season standings

Team podiums

1 victory – (1 )
2 podiums – (2 )

References

External links
 
 Official website 

1980 births
Cross-country skiers at the 2002 Winter Olympics
Cross-country skiers at the 2006 Winter Olympics
Cross-country skiers at the 2010 Winter Olympics
Czech male cross-country skiers
Living people
Olympic cross-country skiers of the Czech Republic
Sportspeople from Karlovy Vary
FIS Nordic World Ski Championships medalists in cross-country skiing
University of West Bohemia alumni